The Somnambulist is a 2007 fantasy/horror novel set in the late Victorian period, and is the debut novel by Jonathan Barnes. The protagonists Edward Moon, a conjurer and detective, and his silent partner The Somnambulist, a milk-drinking giant who does not bleed when stabbed, are called to investigate a murder that may tie to the poetry and prophecies of Samuel Taylor Coleridge and the fate of London.

External links
Review in The Guardian

British fantasy novels
2007 British novels
Novels set in Victorian England
Novels set in London
Victor Gollancz Ltd books
2007 debut novels